Baishizhou is an area of Nanshan District, Shenzhen, Guangdong, China.  about 150,000 people live in Baishizhou. Accounting for unregistered and undocumented residents, some estimates of Baishizhou's rental population are well above two hundred thousand. 

In 2014 Charlie Lanyon of The South China Morning Post described it as "one of the last vestiges of old Shenzhen".

History
Before the mass-migration to the Shenzhen SEZ, Baishizhou had been a destination of immigrants and refugees for centuries. Modern narratives of the village's origins often date the earliest settlement at Baishizhou to a Qing Dynasty habitat named Village of the Ten Thousand Families. 
It is an amalgamation of five existing villages that became one circa 1958 after a collective farm opened. The Shenzhen government bought land around, but not within, the villages and redeveloped it.

In 2014 the Shenzhen government announced that it was going to demolish existing developments and redevelop Baishizhou.

In 2019 there was another announcement about redeveloping Baishizhou.

Culture
Lanyon noted the abundance of street food and stated that the cuisine was inexpensive and also "excellent".

Transportation
 Baishizhou Station, Shenzhen Metro

Education

Shenzhen Saturday School (深ｾﾝ補習授業校 Shinsen Hoshū Jugyō Kō), a Japanese weekend school, has its office on the 8th floor of the Jinsanjiao Building (金三角大厦/金三角大廈) in Baishizhou.

See also
 Urban village (China)

References

Further reading
 
 
 
 Verbeelen, Katherine (University of Amsterdam). "The Collaboration of Actors in Urban Village Redevelopment Projects in Shenzhen, China" (master's degree thesis). Posted at the New Town Institute.

Nanshan District, Shenzhen
Neighbourhoods in China